Galicia is a historical and geographic region spanning what is now southeastern Poland and western Ukraine, long part of the Polish–Lithuanian Commonwealth. It covers much of the other historic regions of Red Ruthenia (centered on Lviv) and Lesser Poland (centered on Kraków).

The name of the region derives from the medieval city of Halych, and was first mentioned in Hungarian historical chronicles in the year 1206 as Galiciæ. The eastern part of the region was controlled by the medieval Kingdom of Galicia–Volhynia before it was annexed by the Kingdom of Poland in 1352 and became part of the Ruthenian Voivodeship. During the partitions of Poland, it was incorporated into a crown land of the Austrian Empire – the Kingdom of Galicia and Lodomeria.

The nucleus of historic Galicia lies within the modern regions of western Ukraine: the Lviv, Ternopil, and Ivano-Frankivsk oblasts near Halych. In the 18th century, territories that later became part of the modern Polish regions of the Lesser Poland Voivodeship, Subcarpathian Voivodeship, and Silesian Voivodeship were added to Galicia after the collapse of the Polish-Lithuanian Commonwealth.

Eastern Galicia became contested ground between Poland and Ruthenia in medieval times and was fought over by Austria-Hungary and Russia during World War I and also Poland and Ukraine in the 20th century. In the 10th century, several cities were founded there, such as Volodymyr and Jaroslaw, whose names mark their connections with the Grand Princes of Kiev. There is considerable overlap between Galicia and Podolia (to the east) as well as between Galicia and south-west Ruthenia, especially in a cross-border region (centred on Carpathian Ruthenia) inhabited by various nationalities and religious groups.

Origins and variations of the name
The name of the region in the local languages is:

 ; romanized: Halychyna;
 
 ; 
 ; 
 ; 
 ; 
 ; 
 .

The Ukrainian name  ( in Polish,  in Russian,  in Latin) comes from the Khwalis or Kaliz who occupied the area from the time of the Magyars. Some historians speculated that the name had to do with a group of people of Thracian origin (i.e. Getae) who during the Iron Age moved into the area after the Roman conquest of Dacia in 106 CE and may have formed the Lypytsia culture with the Venedi people who moved into the region at the end of La Tène period. The Lypytsia culture supposedly replaced the existing Thracian Hallstatt (see Thraco-Cimmerian) and Vysotske cultures. A connection with Celtic peoples supposedly explains the relation of the name "Galicia" to many similar place names found across Europe and Asia Minor, such as ancient  or Gaul (modern France, Belgium, and northern Italy), Galatia (in Asia Minor), the Iberian Peninsula's Galicia, and Romanian .Some other scholars assert that the name Halych has Slavic origins – from halytsa, meaning "a naked (unwooded) hill", or from halka which means "jackdaw".
(The jackdaw featured as a charge in the city's coat of arms
and later also in the coat of arms of Galicia-Lodomeria.
The name, however, predates the coat of arms, which may represent canting or simply folk etymology). Although Ruthenians drove out the Hungarians from Halych-Volhynia by 1221, Hungarian kings continued to add  to their official titles.

In 1349, in the course of the Galicia–Volhynia Wars, King Casimir III the Great of Poland conquered the major part of Galicia and put an end to the independence of this territory. Upon the conquest Casimir adopted the following title: Casimir by the grace of God king of Poland and Rus (Ruthenia), lord and heir of the land of Kraków, Sandomierz, Sieradz, Łęczyca, Kuyavia, Pomerania (Pomerelia). . 

Under the Jagiellonian dynasty (Kings of Poland from 1386 to 1572), the Kingdom of Poland revived and reconstituted its territories. In place of historic Galicia there appeared the Ruthenian Voivodeship.

In 1526, after the death of Louis II of Hungary, the Habsburgs inherited the Hungarian claims to the titles of the Kingship of Galicia and Lodomeria, together with the Hungarian crown. In 1772 the Habsburg Empress Maria Theresa, Archduchess of Austria and Queen of Hungary, used those historical claims to justify her participation in the First Partition of Poland. In fact, the territories acquired by Austria did not correspond exactly to those of former Halych-Volhynia – the Russian Empire took control of Volhynia to the north-east, including the city of Volodymyr-Volynskyi – after which Lodomeria was named.

After the incorporation of the Free City of Kraków in 1846, it was extended to Kingdom of Galicia and Lodomeria, and the Grand Duchy of Kraków with the Duchies of Auschwitz and Zator.

Each of those entities was formally separate; they were listed as such in the Austrian emperor's titles, each had its distinct coat-of-arms and flag. For administrative purposes, however, they formed a single province. Lodomeria, under the name Volhynia, remained under the rule of the Russian Empire – see Volhynian Governorate.

History

In Roman times, the region was populated by various tribes of Celto-Germanic admixture, including Celtic-based tribes, the Lugians, Cotini, Vandals and Goths (the Przeworsk and Púchov cultures). During the Migration Period, a variety of nomadic groups invaded the area. The East Slavic tribes White Croats and Tivertsi dominated the area since the 6th century until it was annexed to Kievan Rus' in the 10th century.

In the 12th century, a Rurikid Principality of Halych (Halicz, Halics, Galich, Galic) formed, which merged at the end of the century with neighbouring Volhynia into the Kingdom of Ruthenia. Galicia and Volhynia had originally been two separate Rurikid principalities, assigned on a rotating basis to younger members of the Kievan dynasty. The line of Prince Roman the Great of Volodymyr had held the principality of Volhynia, while the line of Yaroslav Osmomysl held the Principality of Halych. Galicia–Volhynia was created following the death in 1198 or 1199 (and without a recognised heir in the paternal line) of the last Prince of Galicia, Vladimir II Yaroslavich; Roman acquired the Principality of Galicia and united his lands into one state. Roman's successors would mostly use Halych (Galicia) as the designation of their combined kingdom. In Roman's time Galicia–Volhynia's principal cities were Halych and Volodymyr. In 1204, Roman captured Kyiv in alliance with Poland, signed a peace treaty with the Kingdom of Hungary and established diplomatic relations with the Byzantine Empire.

In 1205, Roman turned against his Polish allies, leading to a conflict with Leszek the White and Konrad of Masovia. Roman was killed in the Battle of Zawichost (1205), and Galicia–Volhynia entered a period of rebellion and chaos, becoming an arena of rivalry between Poland and Hungary. King Andrew II of Hungary styled himself , Latin for "king of Galicia and Vladimir [in-Volhynia]", a title that later was adopted in the House of Habsburg. In a compromise agreement made in 1214 between Hungary and Poland, the throne of Galicia–Volhynia was given to Andrew's son, Coloman of Lodomeria.

In 1352, when the principality was divided between Poland and the Grand Duchy of Lithuania, the territory became subject to the Polish Crown. With the Union of Lublin in 1569, Poland and Lithuania merged to form the Polish–Lithuanian Commonwealth, which lasted for 200 years until conquered and divided up by Russia, Prussia, and Austria in the 1772 partition of the Polish–Lithuanian Commonwealth. The south-eastern part of the former Polish–Lithuanian Commonwealth was awarded to the Habsburg Empress Maria-Theresa, whose bureaucrats named it the Kingdom of Galicia and Lodomeria, after one of the titles of the princes of Hungary, although its borders coincided but roughly with those of the former medieval principality. Known informally as Galicia, it became the largest, most populous, and northernmost province of the Austrian Empire. After 1867 it was part of the Austrian half of Austria-Hungary, until the dissolution of the monarchy at the end of World War I in 1918.

During the First World War, Galicia saw heavy fighting between the forces of the Russian Empire and the Central Powers, on the Eastern Front of World War I. The Russian forces overran most of the region in 1914 after defeating the Austro-Hungarian army in a chaotic frontier battle in the opening months of the war. They were in turn pushed out in the spring and summer of 1915 by a combined German/Austro-Hungarian offensive.

In 1918, Western Galicia became a part of the restored Republic of Poland, which absorbed the Lemko-Rusyn Republic. The local Ukrainian population declared the independence of Eastern Galicia as the short-lived West Ukrainian People's Republic. During the Polish-Soviet War, the Soviets tried to establish the puppet-state of the Galician SSR in East Galicia, but the territory was then conquered by the Poles.

The 1921 Peace of Riga confirmed Galicia's status as part of the Second Polish Republic. Although never accepted as legitimate by some Ukrainian nationalists, this was ratified by the Conference of Ambassadors on 14 March 1923 and internationally recognized on 15 May 1923.

The Ukrainians of Eastern Galicia and the neighbouring province of Volhynia made up about 12% of the Polish Republic's population, and were its largest minority. As Polish government policies were discriminatory towards minorities, tensions between the Polish government and the Ukrainian population grew, eventually giving rise to the militant underground Organization of Ukrainian Nationalists.

People

In 1773, Galicia had about 2.6 million inhabitants in 280 cities and market towns and approximately 5,500 villages. There were nearly 19,000 noble families, with 95,000 members (about 3% of the population). The serfs accounted for 1.86 million, more than 70% of the population. A small number were full-time farmers, but by far the overwhelming number (84%) had only smallholdings or no possessions.

Galicia had arguably the most ethnically diverse population of all the countries in the Austrian monarchy, consisting mainly of Poles and "Ruthenians"; the peoples known later as Ukrainians and Rusyns, as well as ethnic Jews, Germans, Armenians, Czechs, Slovaks, Hungarians, Roma and others. In Galicia as a whole, the population in 1910 was estimated to be 45.4% Polish, 42.9% Ruthenian, 10.9% Jewish, and 0.8% German. This population was not evenly distributed. The Poles lived mainly in the west, with the Ruthenians predominant in the eastern region ("Ruthenia"). At the turn of the twentieth century, Poles constituted 88% of the whole population of Western Galicia and Jews 7.5%. The respective data for Eastern Galicia show the following numbers: Ruthenians 64.5%, Poles 22.0%, Jews 12%. Of the 44 administrative divisions of Austrian eastern Galicia, Lviv was the only one in which Poles made up a majority of the population. Anthropologist Marianna Dushar has argued that this diversity led to a development of a distinctive food culture in the region.

The Polish language was historically predominant throughout Galicia. According to the 1910 census, 58.6% of Galicia spoke Polish as its mother tongue, compared to 40.2% who spoke a Ruthenian language. The number of Polish-speakers may have been inflated because Jews were not given the option of listing Yiddish as their language. Eastern Galicia was the most diverse part of the region, and one of the most diverse areas in Europe at the time. In 1910, Eastern Galicia had 5.3 million inhabitants, with 39.8% being Polish and 58.9% Ruthenian.

The Galician Jews immigrated in the Middle Ages from Germany. German-speaking people were more commonly referred to by the region of Germany where they originated (such as Saxony or Swabia). For those who spoke different native languages, e.g. Poles and Ruthenians, identification was less problematic, and the widespread multilingualism blurred ethnic divisions.

Religiously, Galicia is predominantly Catholic, and Catholicism is practiced in two rites. Poles are Roman Catholic, while Ukrainians belong to the Greek Catholic Church. Other Christians belong to one of the Ukrainian Orthodox Churches. Until the Holocaust, Judaism was widespread, and Galicia was the center of Hasidism.

Economy

The new state borders cut Galicia off from many of its traditional trade routes and markets of the Polish sphere, resulting in stagnation of economic life and decline of Galician towns. Lviv lost its status as a significant trade center. After a short period of limited investments, the Austrian government started the fiscal exploitation of Galicia and drained the region of manpower through conscription to the imperial army. The Austrians decided that Galicia should not develop industrially but remain an agricultural area that would serve as a supplier of food products and raw materials to other Habsburg provinces. New taxes were instituted, investments were discouraged, and cities and towns were neglected. The result was significant poverty in Austrian Galicia. Galicia was the poorest province of Austro-Hungary, and according to Norman Davies, could be considered "the poorest province in Europe".

Oil and natural gas industry

Near Drohobych and Boryslav in Galicia, significant oil reserves were discovered and developed during the mid 19th and early 20th centuries. The first European attempt to drill for oil was in Bóbrka in western Galicia in 1854. By 1867, a well at Kleczany, in Western Galicia, was drilled using steam to about 200 meters. On 31 December 1872, a railway line linking Borysław (now Boryslav) with the nearby city of Drohobycz (now Drohobych) was opened. British engineer John Simeon Bergheim and Canadian William Henry McGarvey came to Galicia in 1882. In 1883, their company bored holes of 700 to 1,000 meters and found large oil deposits. In 1885, they renamed their oil developing enterprise the Galician-Karpathian Petroleum Company, headquartered in Vienna, with McGarvey as the chief administrator and Bergheim as a field engineer, and built a huge refinery at Maryampole near Gorlice, south of Tarnow. Considered the biggest, most efficient enterprise in Austro-Hungary, Maryampole was built in six months and employed 1,000 men. Subsequently, investors from Britain, Belgium, and Germany established companies to develop the oil and natural gas industries in Galicia. This influx of capital caused the number of petroleum enterprises to shrink from 900 to 484 by 1884, and to 285 companies manned by 3,700 workers by 1890. However, the number of oil refineries increased from thirty-one in 1880 to fifty-four in 1904. By 1904, there were thirty boreholes in Borysław of over 1,000 meters. Production increased by 50% between 1905 and 1906 and then trebled between 1906 and 1909 because of unexpected discoveries of vast oil reserves of which many were gushers. By 1909, production reached its peak at 2,076,000 tons or 4% of worldwide production. Often called the "Polish Baku", the oil fields of Borysław and nearby Tustanowice accounted for over 90% of the national oil output of the Austro-Hungarian Empire. From 500 residents in the 1860s, Borysław had swollen to 12,000 by 1898. At the turn of the century, Galicia was ranked fourth in the world as an oil producer. This significant increase in oil production also caused a slump in oil prices. A very rapid decrease in oil production in Galicia occurred just before the Balkan Wars of 1912–1913.

Galicia was the Central Powers' only major domestic source of oil during the Great War.

Ethnic groups
 Mountain Dwellers (larger kinship group): Żywczaki or Gorals of Żywiec (pl: górale żywieccy), Babiogórcy or Gorals of Babia Góra, Gorals of Rabka or Zagórzanie, Kliszczaki, Gorals in Podhale (pl: górale podhalańscy), Gorals of Nowy Targ or Nowotarżanie, Górale pienińscy or Gorals of Pieniny and Górale sądeccy (Gorals of Nowy Sącz), Gorals of Spisz or Gardłaki, Kurtacy or Czuchońcy (Lemkos, Rusnaks), Boykos (Werchowyńcy), Tucholcy, Hutsuls (Czarnogórcy).
 Dale Dwellers (larger kinship group): Krakowiacy, Mazury, Grębowiacy (Lesowiacy or Borowcy), Głuchoniemcy, Bełżanie, Bużanie (Łopotniki, Poleszuki), Opolanie, Wołyniacy, Pobereżcy or Nistrowianie.

See also
Kingdom of Galicia and Lodomeria
Subdivisions of Galicia
Bukovina
Podolia
West Ukrainian People's Republic
Galician Soviet Socialist Republic
History of the Jews in Galicia (Eastern Europe)
District of Galicia
Lesser Poland
List of rulers of Halych and Volhynia
List of Galician rulers
List of towns of the former Kingdom of Galicia and Lodomeria
Massacres of Poles in Volhynia and Eastern Galicia
Distrikt Galizien
Galatia
Galician Russophilia
Galician Americans

Notes

References

Citations

Sources

{{cite book |last=Berend |first=Nora |year=2006|title=At the Gate of Christendom: Jews, Muslims and "Pagans" in Medieval Hungary, c. 1000-c.1300 |publisher=Cambridge University Press |isbn=978-0-521-02720-5}}

Further reading

 Dohrn, Verena. Journey to Galicia, (S. Fischer, 1991), 
 Frank, Alison Fleig. Oil Empire: Visions of Prosperity in Austrian Galicia (Harvard University Press, 2005).  A new monograph on the history of the Galician oil industry in both the Austrian and European contexts.
 Christopher Hann and Paul Robert Magocsi, eds., Galicia: A Multicultured Land (Toronto: University of Toronto Press, 2005). A collection of articles by John Paul Himka, Yaroslav Hrytsak, Stanislaw Stepien, and others.
 Paul Robert Magocsi, Galicia: A Historical Survey and Bibliographic Guide (Toronto: University of Toronto Press, 1983). Concentrates on the historical, or Eastern Galicia.
 Andrei S. Markovits and Frank E. Sysyn, eds., Nationbuilding and the Politics of Nationalism: Essays on Austrian Galicia (Cambridge, Massachusetts: Harvard University Press, 1982). Contains an important article by Piotr Wandycz on the Poles, and an equally important article by Ivan L. Rudnytsky on the Ukrainians.
A.J.P. Taylor, The Habsburg Monarchy 1809–1918, 1941, discusses Habsburg policy toward ethnic minorities.
 Wolff, Larry. The Idea of Galicia: History and Fantasy in Habsburg Political Culture (Stanford University Press; 2010) 504 pages. Examines the role in history and cultural imagination of a province created by the 1772 partition of Poland that later disappeared, in official terms, in 1918.
 Grzegorz Hryciuk, Liczba i skład etniczny ludności tzw. Galicji Wschodniej w latach 1931–1959'', [Number and Ethnic Composition of the People of so-called Eastern Galicia 1931–1959] Lublin 1996

External links 

Jewish Encyclopedia
1902 map of the oilfields in Galicia

 
Regions of Europe
Divided regions
Kingdom of Galicia–Volhynia
Historical regions in Poland
Historical regions in Ukraine
Historical regions in the Kingdom of Hungary
Carpathians
Historic Jewish communities
Lesser Poland
Place name etymologies
Rusyn communities